Ernst von Dohnányi (Hungarian: Dohnányi Ernő, ; 27 July 1877 – 9 February 1960) was a Hungarian composer, pianist and conductor. He used a German form of his name on most published compositions.

Biography
Dohnányi was born in Pozsony, Kingdom of Hungary, Austria-Hungary (today Bratislava, capital of Slovakia). He was the son of Frigyes Dohnányi and his wife Ottilia Szlabey. He first studied music with his father, a professor of mathematics and an amateur cellist, and then when he was eight years old, with Carl Forstner, organist at the local cathedral. In 1894, in his 17th year, he moved to Budapest and enrolled in the Royal National Hungarian Academy of Music, studying piano with István Thomán and composition with Hans von Koessler, a cousin of Max Reger.

István Thomán had been a favorite student of Franz Liszt, while Hans von Koessler was a devotee of Johannes Brahms's music. These two influences played an important part in Dohnányi's life: Liszt on his piano playing and Brahms on his compositions. Dohnányi's first published work, his Piano Quintet in C minor, earned approval from Brahms, who promoted it in Vienna. Dohnányi did not study long at the Academy of Music: in June 1897 he sought to take the final exams right away, without completing his studies. Permission was granted, and a few days later he passed with high marks, as composer and pianist, graduating at less than 20 years of age.

After a few lessons with Eugen d'Albert, another student of Liszt, Dohnányi made his debut in Berlin in 1897 and was recognized at once as a performer of high merit. Similar success followed in Vienna and on a subsequent tour of Europe. He made his London debut at a Richter concert in Queen's Hall, with a notable performance of Beethoven's Piano Concerto No. 4. He was among the first to conduct and popularize Bartók's more accessible music.

During the 1898 season, Dohnányi visited the United States, where he gained a reputation playing Beethoven's Piano Concerto No. 4 for his American debut with the St. Louis Symphony. Unlike most famous pianists of the time, he did not limit himself to solo recitals and concertos, but also appeared in chamber music. In 1901 he completed his Symphony No. 1, his first orchestral work. Although he was heavily influenced by established contemporaries, notably Brahms, it displayed considerable technical skill in its own right.

Dohnányi first married Elisabeth "Elsa" Kunwald (also a pianist), who bore him a son, Hans, in 1902. Hans was to be the father of the German politician Klaus von Dohnányi and of the conductor Christoph von Dohnányi, long Music Director of the Cleveland Orchestra. Hans distinguished himself as a leader of the anti-Nazi resistance in Germany and was ultimately executed in the final stages of World War II. In addition to Hans, Dohnányi and Elsa Kunwald also had a daughter, Greta.

Following an invitation by the violinist Joseph Joachim, a close friend of Brahms, Dohnányi taught at the Hochschule in Berlin from 1905 to 1915. There he wrote The Veil of Pierrette, Op. 18, and the Suite in F-sharp minor, Op. 19. Returning to Budapest, he appeared in a remarkable number of performances over the following decade, notably in the Beethoven sesquicentenial year of 1920/1921.

Before World War I broke out, Dohnányi met and fell in love with a German actress (also described as a singer), Elsa Galafrés, who was married to the Polish Jewish violinist Bronisław Huberman. They could not yet marry as their spouses refused to divorce them, but nonetheless, Dohnányi and Elsa Galafrés had a son, Matthew, in January 1917. Both later gained the divorces they sought and were married in June 1919. Dohnányi also adopted Johannes, Elsa's son by Huberman.

During the short-lived Hungarian Soviet Republic of 1919, Dohnányi was appointed Director of the Budapest Academy, but a few months later the new interim government replaced him with the prominent violinist Jenő Hubay after Dohnányi had refused to dismiss the pedagogue and composer Zoltán Kodály from the Academy for his supposedly leftist political position. However in 1920, with Admiral Horthy becoming Regent of Hungary, Dohnányi was named Music Director of the Budapest Philharmonic Orchestra and as such promoted the music of Béla Bartók, Zoltán Kodály, Leo Weiner and other contemporary Hungarian composers. That same 1920 season, he performed the complete piano works of Beethoven and recorded several of his works on the Ampico player-piano-roll apparatus. He gained renown as a teacher. His pupils included Andor Földes, Mischa Levitzki, Ervin Nyiregyházi, Géza Anda, Annie Fischer, Hope Squire, Helen Camille Stanley, Bertha Tideman-Wijers, Edward Kilenyi, Bálint Vázsonyi, Sir Georg Solti, Istvan Kantor, Georges Cziffra and Ľudovít Rajter (conductor and Dohnányi's godson). In 1933 he organized the first International Franz Liszt Piano Competition.

In 1937 Dohnányi met Ilona Zachár, who was married with two children. By this time, he had separated from his second wife Elsa Galafrés. He and Ilona travelled throughout Europe as husband and wife, but were not legally married until they settled in the United States. After Dohnányi's death, Ilona, in her biography, launched a campaign to quell his hardly deserved reputation as a Nazi sympathizer. Peter Halász continued this in an article titled "Persecuted Musicians in Hungary between 1919–1945", which portrayed him as a "victim" of Nazism, and by James Grymes, who in his book called Dohnányi saw him as "a forgotten hero of the Holocaust resistance".

In 1934 Dohnányi was once again appointed Director of the Budapest Academy of Music, a post he held until 1943. According to the 2015 entry on Dohnányi in New Grove Dictionary of Music and Musicians, "From 1939 much of [Dohnányi's] time was devoted to the fight against growing Nazi influences. By 1941 he had resigned his directorial post at the Budapest Academy of Music, rather than submit to the anti-Jewish legislation. In his orchestra, the Budapest Philharmonic  he managed to keep on all Jewish members until two months after the German occupation of Hungary on 19 March 1944, in Operation Margarethe, when he disbanded the ensemble. In November 1944 he moved to Austria, a decision which drew criticism for many years. In fact, Dohnányi was criticized either from the left or from the right for most of his deeds, from his student days on. "The explanation may be found in his unassailability on musical or ethical grounds.... The "accusations" levelled against him always took the form of rumours. This, and the magnitude of the so-called charges (never substantiated), made it impossible for Dohnányi to defend himself."

At a March 2014 conference, "The Holocaust in Hungary, 70 Years On: New Perspectives" at the Center for Judaic, Holocaust, and Genocide Studies at Florida Gulf Coast University, the musicologist James A. Grymes presented research based on archival evidence he had gathered in Budapest, in a paper entitled "Ernst von Dohnányi: A Forgotten Hero of the Holocaust Resistance." It credits Dohnányi with (in the author's summary) 1) with "blocking the creation of a Hungarian Chamber of Music that would have excluded Jews from the music profession, just as the infamous Reichsmusikkammer did in Nazi Germany," 2) with resigning "from his position as Director General of the Franz Liszt Academy of Music instead of carrying out orders to fire Jewish instructors," 3) "as the conductor of the Budapest Philharmonic, Dohnányi [disbanding] the ensemble rather than dismiss its Jewish members," and 4) assisting "a number of individual Jewish musicians. These included impresario Andrew Schulhof, whom Dohnányi helped to emigrate from Germany to the United States in 1939. Pianist  was discharged from the labor service when Dohnányi wrote a letter declaring Hernádi and his hands to be irreplaceable national treasures. When the famous violinist Carl Flesch and his wife were in grave danger of being deported to a concentration camp, Dohnányi helped to reinstate their Hungarian nationality, enabling them to travel through Germany, back to Hungary, and ultimately to Switzerland. Dohnányi personally saved the pianist György Ferenczy, Ferenczy's wife, and several other Jewish musicians from the death trains. Zoltán Kodály later reported that Dohnányi had signed dozens of documents that had saved Jewish lives during the Holocaust. In Ernst von Dohnányi: A Song of Life, Dohnányi's widow placed that number in the hundreds. Jewish violinist, violist, and composer Tibor Serly went so far as to credit Dohnányi's frequent interventions for the fact that "not one Jewish musician of any reputation living in Hungary lost his life or perished during the entire period of World War II."

Grymes notes that after the war, Dohnányi "was investigated and cleared several times by the U.S. Military Government" – as a precondition to his postwar move to Florida. He comments that Dohnányi was "repeatedly defended by prominent Jewish musicians who had worked closely with him in Hungary, including violist Egon Kenton [Kornstein], pianist Edward Kilenyi, musicologist Bence Szabolcsi, and composer Leó Weiner. The latter wrote at least two testimonials pointing out that the majority of Dohnányi's students had been Jewish and that Dohnányi had consistently programmed Weiner's own compositions, even during the Nazi regime."

From 1949, Dohnányi taught for ten years at the Florida State University School of Music in Tallahassee. He became an honorary member of the Epsilon Iota chapter of Phi Mu Alpha Sinfonia fraternity there. He and his wife Ilona became American citizens in 1955.

In the United States, he continued to compose and became interested in American folk music. His last orchestral work (except for a 1957 revision of the Symphony No. 2) was American Rhapsody (1953), written for the sesquicentennial of Ohio University and including folk material, for example, "Turkey in the Straw", "On Top of Old Smokey" and "I am a poor wayfaring stranger".

His last public performance, on January 30, 1960, was at Florida State University, conducting the university orchestra in Beethoven's Piano Concerto No. 4, with his doctoral student, Edward R. Thaden, as soloist. After the performance, Dohnányi traveled to New York City to record some Beethoven piano sonatas and shorter piano pieces for Everest Records. He had previously recorded a Mozart concerto in the early 1930s in Hungary (No. 17, in G major, K. 453, playing and conducting the Budapest Philharmonic), for Columbia, and also his own Variations on a Nursery Tune issued by HMV in England and RCA Victor in the United States, the second movement of his Ruralia hungarica (Gypsy Andante), and a few solo works (but no Beethoven sonatas) on 78 rpm. He had also recorded various other works, including Beethoven's Tempest Sonata and Haydn's F minor Variations, on early mono LPs.

Death
Dohnányi died of pneumonia on 9 February 1960, in New York City, ten days after his final performance, and was buried in Tallahassee, Florida, where he had taught at the university for ten years.

Influence and legacy
The BBC issued an LP recording taken from one of his last concerts, heard in 1959 at Florida State University, in which he played Beethoven's piano sonata Op. 31 No. 1 and Schubert's piano sonata D. 894. The Testament label has reissued the recital on CD in a set that also includes three of the pianist's own short pieces that he played there as encores, a short recital of his works that he played at the 1956 Edinburgh Festival, and a few that were broadcast on the BBC in 1936.
Dohnányi's three volumes of Daily Finger Exercises for the Advanced Pianist were published by Mills Music in 1962.
The Warren D. Allen Music Library at Florida State University's College of Music holds a large archive of Dohnányi's papers, manuscripts and related materials.
The Hungarian government posthumously awarded him its highest civilian honor, the Kossuth Prize, in 1990.
An International Ernst von Dohnányi Festival was held at Florida State University in 2002. The LSU professor Milton Hallman was a student of his and in 1987 recorded a CD called Works For Piano containing some of Dohnányi's most notable music.

Compositions
Dohnányi's composing style was personal, but very conservative. His music largely subscribes to the romantic idiom. Although he used elements of Hungarian folk music, he is not seen to draw on folk traditions in the way that Bartók or Kodály do. Some characterize his style as traditional mainstream Euro-Germanic in the Brahmsian manner (structurally more than in the way the music actually sounds) rather than specifically Hungarian, while others hear very little of Brahms in his music. The very best of his works may be his Serenade in C major for string trio, Op. 10 (1902) and Variations on a Nursery Tune for piano and orchestra, Op. 25 (1914). His Second symphony is a major work which he composed during the Second World War. It is uncharacteristically sombre, notably in the third movement, which is grotesque and dissonant.

Stage
Der Schleier der Pierrette (The Veil of Pierrette), Mime in three parts (Libretto after Arthur Schnitzler), Op. 18 (1909)
Tante Simona (Aunt Simona), Comic Opera in one act (Libretto by Victor Heindl), Op. 20 (1912)
A vajda tornya (The Tower of the Voivod), Romantic Opera in three acts (Libretto by Viktor Lányi, after Hans Heinz Ewers and Marc Henry), Op. 30 (1922)
A tenor (The Tenor), Comic Opera in three acts (Libretto by Ernő Góth and Carl Sternheim, after Bürger Schippel by Carl Sternheim), Op. 34 (1927)

Choral
Szegedi mise (Szeged Mass, also Missa in Dedicatione Ecclesiae), Op. 35 (1930)
Cantus vitae, Symphonic Cantata, Op. 38 (1941)
Stabat mater, Op. 46 (1953)

Orchestral
Symphony in F major (1896, unpublished) - Hungarian King's Prize in 1897
Symphony No. 1 in D minor, Op. 9 (1901)
Suite in F-sharp minor, Op. 19 (1909)
Ünnepi nyitány (Festival Overture), Op. 31 (1923)
Ruralia hungarica (based on Hungarian folk tunes), Op. 32b (1924)
Szimfonikus percek (Symphonic Minutes), Op. 36 (1933)
Symphony No. 2 in E major, Op. 40 (1945, revised 1954-7) 
American Rhapsody, Op. 47 (1953)

Solo instrument and orchestra
Piano Concerto No. 1 in E minor, Op. 5 (1898) (the opening theme was inspired by Brahms's Symphony No. 1)
Konzertstück (Concertpiece) in D major for cello and orchestra, Op. 12 (1904)
Variations on a Nursery Tune  (Variationen über ein Kinderlied) for piano and orchestra, Op. 25 (1914)
Violin Concerto No. 1 in D minor, Op. 27 (1915)
Piano Concerto No. 2 in B minor, Op. 42 (1947)
Violin Concerto No. 2 in C minor, Op. 43 (1950)
Concertino for harp and chamber orchestra, Op. 45 (1952)

Chamber and instrumental
String Quartet in D minor, 1893 (unpublished, manuscript at British Library) (Grymes, Ernst von Dohnányi: A Bio-bibliography, p. 32)
String Sextet in B major, 1893 (revised 1896, revised and premiered 1898. Recorded on Hungaroton, 2006.) (Grymes, p. 32)
Minuet for String Quartet, 1894 (Grymes, p. 32. Manuscript at the National Széchényi Library)
Piano Quartet in F minor, (1894)
Piano Quintet No. 1 in C minor, Op. 1 (1895)
String Quartet No. 1 in A major, Op. 7 (1899)
Sonata in B minor for cello and piano, Op. 8 (1899)
Serenade in C major for string trio, Op. 10 (1902)
String Quartet No. 2 in D major, Op. 15 (1906)
Sonata in C minor for violin and piano, Op. 21 (1912)
Piano Quintet No. 2 in E minor, Op. 26 (1914)
String Quartet No. 3 in A minor, Op. 33 (1926)
Sextet in C major for piano, strings and winds, Op. 37 (1935)
Aria for flute and piano, Op 48, No. 1 (1958)
Passacaglia for solo flute, Op. 48, No. 2 (1959)

Piano
Four Pieces, Op. 2 (1897, pub. 1905)
Waltzes for four hands, Op. 3 (1897)
Variations and Fugue on a Theme of E[mma].G[ruber]., Op. 4 (1897)
Gavotte and Musette (WoO, 1898)
Albumblatt (WoO, 1899)
Passacaglia in E minor, Op. 6 (1899)
Four Rhapsodies, Op. 11 (1903)
Winterreigen, Op. 13 (1905)
Humoresque in the form of a Suite, Op. 17 (1907)
Three Pieces, Op. 23 (1912)
Fugue for left hand (WoO, 1913)
Suite in the Old Style, Op. 24 (1913)
Six Concert Etudes, Op. 28 (1916)
Variations on a Hungarian Folksong, Op. 29 (1917)
Pastorale on a Hungarian Christmas Song (WoO, 1920)
Valses nobles, concert arrangement for piano (after Schubert, D. 969) (WoO, 1920)
Ruralia hungarica, Op. 32a (1923)
Waltz for Piano from Delibes' "Coppelia" (WoO, 1925)
Waltz Suite, for two pianos, Op. 39a (1945),
Limping Waltz for solo piano, Op. 39b (1947)
Six Pieces, Op. 41 (1945)
Three Singular Pieces, Op. 44 (1951)
Twelve Short Studies for the Advanced Pianist (1951)

References
Notes

Sources

Further reading
William Lines Hubbard et al., eds., The American History and Encyclopedia of Music, vol. 1 (London: Irving Squire, 1908), pp. 183–184 available online

External links

Ernő Dohnányi Discography
Ernő Dohnányi Profile at The Remington Site
Dohnanyi String Quartet Nos 1 & 2 sound-bites
Warren D. Allen Music Library at Florida State University
Lecture by D. Kiszely-Papp on piano music of Dohnányi
In Memoriam concerts
Ampico Piano Solo "Music Of The Spheres" (Sphärenmusik) from "Winterreigen" Opus 13, by Ernst Von Dohnanyi, played by E. V. Dohnanyi on the Ampico Reproducing Piano (7 ft grand piano)

Sheet music

Videos
 played by Classical Jam

1877 births
1960 deaths
19th-century classical composers
19th-century conductors (music)
20th-century classical composers
20th-century conductors (music)
20th-century Hungarian male musicians
Neoromantic composers
Composers for piano
Male conductors (music)
Male classical pianists
Hungarian classical composers
Hungarian male classical composers
Hungarian classical pianists
Hungarian conductors (music)
Musicians from Bratislava
Franz Liszt Academy of Music alumni
Academic staff of the Franz Liszt Academy of Music
Florida State University faculty
Pupils of Hans von Koessler
Pupils of István Thomán
Erno Dohnanyi
Deaths from pneumonia in New York City